Them is the first studio album by American hip hop duo Themselves. It was originally released under the name Them on Anticon in 2000. In 2003, it was re-released under the name Themselves.

Critical reception
Thomas Quinlan of Exclaim! gave the album a favorable review, calling it "a classic hip-hop album that is destined to forever burst the boundaries of what should be considered hip-hop." Ali Maloney of The Skinny said, "Despite the seemingly simple beats and raps configuration, there is no shortage of jaw-dropping pyrotechnics and originality on show here."

In 2015, Fact placed it at number 96 on its "100 Best Indie Hip-Hop Records of All Time" list.

Track listing

References

External links
 

2000 debut albums
Themselves albums
Anticon albums
Albums produced by J. Rawls